Imperialism, colonialism and irredentism played an important role in the foreign policy of Fascist Italy. Among the regime's goals were the acquisition of territory considered historically Italian in France (e.g. Nice) and Yugoslavia (e.g. Dalmatia), the expansion of Italy's sphere of influence into the Balkans (e.g. Greece) and the acquisition of more colonies in Africa. The pacification of Libya (1923–32), the invasion of Ethiopia (1935–36), the invasion of Albania (1939), the invasion of France (1940), the invasion of Greece (1940–41) and the invasion of Yugoslavia (1941) were all undertaken in part to add to Italy's national space. According to historian Patrick Bernhard, Fascist Italian imperialism under Benito Mussolini, particularly in Africa, served as a model for the much more famous expansionism of Nazi Germany in Eastern Europe.

History
After his appointment as Governor of the Dodecanese in 1936, the fascist leader Cesare Maria De Vecchi started to promote within Benito Mussolini's National Fascist Party an idea  of a new "Imperial Italy", one that, like a recreation of the Roman Empire, went beyond Europe and included northern Africa (the Fourth Shore or "Quarta Sponda" in Italian).

De Vecchi's dream was an Imperial Italy that included not only all the European territories wanted by the Italian irredentists (Nice, Savoy, Ticino, Dalmatia, Corfu, Malta and Corsica) and populated by Italian communities for many centuries, but even the north African territories (Libya and Tunisia), where Italian emigrants had created "colonies" in the late nineteenth century.

After 1936 and during World War II, the Greek Dodecanese islands were also included in the project (with the Ionian islands of Zante, Ithaca, etc.) and the fascist regime soon promoted a process of forced Italianization of these Greek islands.

Italy annexed the coastal provinces of its colony of Libya in 1938 and made them national provinces of Italy that were to be Italianized.

In preparation for war with France in 1940, the Fascist regime intended to gain Corsica, Nice, Savoy, and the colonies of Tunisia and Djibouti from France. Foreign Minister Count Ciano on 10 June 1940 issued support for the partition of Switzerland between Germany and Italy, with Italy annexing Ticino, Grisons, and Valais.

The opinions of De Vecchi were partially accepted by Mussolini in the 1940s, when Italy entered World War II, but found  opposition (and scepticism) in the King of Italy, Victor Emmanuel III.

In 1942, with the Italian occupation of Corsica and Tunisia, the territories of the "Imperial Italy" dreamed of by the fascist De Vecchi were fully in Italian hands, with the exception of Malta, but the project was not politically implemented because the war was turning against the Axis powers.

The Dodecanese 
De Vecchi effected the first step towards an Italia Imperiale (or Grande Italia) when in 1936, as Italian Governor of the Dodecanese islands, he imposed official use of the Italian language and created a colony of 7,000 Italians in Rhodes and surrounding islands. In 1940 he was appointed to the Grand Council of Fascism where later, during the Italian occupation of Greece, he proposed that the Kingdom of Italy annex the Dodecanese and Ionian islands, with the island of Chios, which had once belonged to the Republic of Genoa.

The Fourth Shore 
Another fascist leader, Italo Balbo, promoted actively the development of Italian communities in coastal Libya, after the country was pacified from an Arab guerrilla war. Balbo called Tripolitania and Cyrenaica the Quarta Sponda (Fourth Shore) of Italy in reference to the other three shores (the western, the Adriatic and the southern) of the Italian peninsula.

One of the initial Italian objectives in Libya, indeed, had been the relief of overpopulation and unemployment in Italy through emigration to the undeveloped colony. With security established, systematic "demographic colonization" was encouraged by King Victor Emmanuel III's government. A project initiated by Libya's governor, Italo Balbo, brought the first 20,000 settlers — the "Ventimila" - to Libya in a single convoy in October 1938. More settlers followed in 1939, and by 1940 there were approximately 110,000 Italians in Libya, constituting about 12 percent of the total population.

Plans envisioned an Italian colony of 500,000 settlers by the 1960s: so, the Italians would be 2/3 of the population in coastal Libya by then. Libya's best land was allocated to the settlers to be brought under productive cultivation, primarily in olive groves. Settlement was directed by a state corporation, the "Libyan Colonization Society", which undertook land reclamation and the building of model villages and offered a grubstake and credit facilities to the settlers it had sponsored.

In November 1942, Tunisia was also included in the "Quarta Sponda" (with nearly 100,000 Tunisian Italians), but a few months later it was occupied by the Allies.

The Western Balkans 
In spring 1941, Mussolini - with the help of the German Army - finally defeated Greece and conquered coastal Yugoslavia.

General Vittorio Ambrosio, the commander of the Italian Army during the conquest of Yugoslav Dalmatia, created a military line of occupation from Ljubljana to northern Montenegro that successively was to be considered as the future border of the "Imperial Italy" in the North-Western Balkans. Within the borders to the south were included Fascist Montenegro, Greater Albania and Epirus.

De Vecchi promoted the inclusion of Corfu (with a significant community of the Corfiot Italians), the Ionian islands and the southern Aegean islands (once controlled by the Republic of Venice), in order to form an "arch" that stretched toward the Dodecanese, Lesvos and Chios (Once controlled by the Republic of Genoa).

Additional proposals 

In the 1940s, De Vecchi contemplated an "Imperial Italy" stretching from Europe to North Africa, made of the "Imperial Italy" (with an enlarged Italian Empire in eastern Africa, from the Egyptian shores on the Mediterranean to Somalia).

He dreamt of a powerful Italy enlarged: 
1) in Europe, from Nice to the Governatorato di Dalmazia in Dalmatia and possibly Greater Albania (see map), the Ionian islands, the Principality of Pindus in Epirus (northern Greece), the Dodecanese. 
2) in northern coastal Africa, from Tunisia to Libya (the Fezzan of Libya was to be considered a colony of the empire).

In a hopeful peace negotiation following an Axis victory, Mussolini had planned to acquire for his Imperial Italy the full island of Crete (that was mostly German occupied) and the surrounding southern Greek islands, connecting the Italian Dodecanese possessions to the already Italian Ionian islands.

South of the Fourth Shore, some fascist leaders dreamt of an Italian Empire that, starting in the Fezzan, would include Egypt, Sudan and reach Italian East Africa.

The Allied victory in the Second World War ended these projects and terminated all fascist ambitions for the empire.

Finally, in 1947 the Italian Republic formally relinquished sovereignty over all its overseas colonial possessions as a result of the Treaty of Peace with Italy. There were discussions to maintain Tripolitania (a province of Italian Libya) as the last Italian colony, but they were not successful.

In November 1949, the former Italian Somaliland, then under British military administration, was made a United Nations Trust Territory under Italian administration for a period of 10 years. On 1 July 1960, the Trust Territory of Somalia merged with British Somaliland to form the independent Somali Republic.

See also
Latin Axis (World War II)

Notes

References 
 Baioni, Massimo. Risorgimento in camicia nera. Carocci. Arezzo, 2006.
 Blitzer, Wolf. Century of War. Friedman/Fairfax Publishers. New York, 2001 
 Chapin Metz, Helen, ed. Libya: A Country Study. GPO for the "Library of Congress". Washington, 1987.
 De Felice, Renzo Interpretations of Fascism (translated by Brenda Huff Everett). Harvard University Press. Cambridge, 1977 .
 De Felice, Renzo. Mussolini l'Alleato: Italia in guerra 1940-1943. Rizzoli Ed. Torino, 1990.
 Del Boca, A. Le guerre coloniali del fascismo Laterza. Roma, 1991
 Galeotti, Carlo. Credere obbedire combattere - I catechismi fascisti  Stampa Alternativa. Milano, 1996.
 Lamb, Richard. Mussolini as Diplomat. Fromm International Ed. London, 1999 
 Payne, Stanley G. A History of Fascism, 1914-45. University of Wisconsin Press. Madison, Wisc., 1995 
 Rosselli, Alberto. Storie Segrete. Operazioni sconosciute o dimenticate della seconda guerra mondiale Iuculano Editore. Pavia, 2007

Modern history of Italy
Kingdom of Italy (1861–1946)
Italian Fascism
Axis powers